Kheyrabad-e Tulalli (also Romanized as Kheyrābād-e Tūlallī; also known as Khairābād, Kheyrābād, and Kheyrābād-e Mayāgh) is a village in Kheyrabad Rural District, in the Central District of Kharameh County, Fars Province, Iran. At the 2006 census, its population was 3,268, in 846 families.

References 

Populated places in Kharameh County